The County of Santa Fiora, also known as State of Santa Fiora was a small historical state of southern Tuscany, in central Italy. Together with the county of Sovana, it was one of the two subdivisions into which the possessions of the Aldobrandeschi, then lords of much of southern Tuscany, were split in 1274.

At the moments of its creation it included part of today's province of Grosseto, up to the Isola del Giglio, and Castiglione d'Orcia, in what is now the province of Siena. In the 14th century the Republic of Siena was able to capture Isola del Giglio, Roccastrada, Istia d'Ombrone, Magliano in Toscana, Selvena, Arcidosso and Castiglione d'Orcia, reducing the county to its capital, Castell'Azzara, Semproniano and Scansano.

In 1439, after the marriage of Bosio I Sforza and the last Aldobrandeschi heir, Cecilia, the county was inherited by the Sforza family, who would become ruler of the Duchy of Milan and owned also other possessions in Tuscany and the Marche.

The sovereignty of the county was ceded to the Grand Duchy of Tuscany in 1633.

The Jewish presence in the County of Santa Fiora was significant, the first evidence dates back to the second half of the 15th century, while a jewish ghetto was established in 1714, when the state was already subject to the Grand Duchy of Tuscany for about 80 years.

References

1633 disestablishments
Santa Fiora
History of Tuscany
States and territories established in 1274
Historic Jewish communities
Santa Fiora